Walter Wood Wilson (November 24, 1913 – April 17, 1994) was a professional baseball pitcher. He played one season in Major League Baseball for the Detroit Tigers in 1945. He was born in Glenn, Georgia.

Wilson began his professional career with the Concord Weavers of the Class D North Carolina State league in 1939.  Wilson was one of many players who only appeared in the majors during World War II. He posted a 1–3 record with a 4.61 ERA in 25 appearances for Detroit, including four starts, giving up 40 runs (four unearned) on 76 hits and 35 walks while striking out 28 in 70.1 innings of work. He was on the Tigers roster for the 1945 World Series but did not appear in any game.  After the 1945 season, he spent two more years in the minor leagues.

Wilson died in Bremen, Georgia, aged 80, and was buried in Glenn Cemetery in his hometown.

References

External links

Retrosheet

Major League Baseball pitchers
Detroit Tigers players
Concord Weavers players
Goldsboro Goldbugs players
Wilmington Blue Rocks (1940–1952) players
Hagerstown Owls players
Buffalo Bisons (minor league) players
Dallas Rebels players
Miami Tourists players
LaGrange Troupers players
Baseball players from Georgia (U.S. state)
People from Heard County, Georgia
1913 births
1994 deaths